HZO manufactures a thin-film nanotechnology that is applied by manufacturers and device makers during their assembly processes to protect electronics from damage caused by exposure to corrosive liquids.  HZO headquarters are located in Raleigh, North Carolina. The company also has Centers of Excellence in Shenzhen, China and Bac Ninh, Vietnam.

Background 

HZO is funded through a combination of equity and debt financing. The company publicly unveiled its protective technology for electronics at the Consumer Electronics Show (CES) in 2012. In 2013 and early 2014 the company expanded its corporate offices and production facilities worldwide to include locations in China, Japan and California. The company also has several application partners throughout Asia with further expansion anticipated. HZO revenues increased by more than 90% in 2013 and the company expects continued growth in 2014 with a consequent increase in royalties. The company’s tagline is “protection from the inside out.”

Technology 

HZO’s technology is applied directly to the circuitry of devices and components, creating a physical barrier that protects electronics against damage caused by water and other corrosive liquids, humidity, sweat, dust and debris. HZO’s early customer base included medical, military, automotive and consumer markets. Products implementing HZO technology include a Tag Heuer smartphone, along with a variety of wearable devices, which has helped secure HZO as a differentiating feature in wearable computing technology.   In 2013, the company unveiled enhancements to its proprietary equipment and machinery, and the company began mass manufacturing with an international brand on a wearable device.

Awards 

Since its official introduction in 2012, HZO has received awards and acknowledgments at a local, national and international level. These include the 2012 CES Innovations Design and Engineering Award for Embedded Technologies, recognition as one of the Top Emerging Nanotech Innovators in both 2012 and 2013 by the National NanoBusiness Commercialization Association, and Winner of 2012 Stoel Rives & Utah Technology Council Innovation Award.
The following year, HZO also received recognition with the following awards;
“Best Advanced Technology” at the Wearable Tech Expo, New York, "Best in Show" at the Wearable Tech Expo, Los Angeles, "Best New Product or Service of the Year" by the International Business Awards, Gold Stevie Award–Consumer Electronics, "Innovative Product of the Year"–Silver Winner, Best in Biz Awards
In 2014, HZO received "Innovation World Cup Finalist" at the Wearable Technologies Conference, Munich and “Best of State in Consumer Electronics”, Utah 2014.

Media 

HZO has received critical acclaim with features on MSNBC in January 2012, The Huffington Post in January, 2012 and April 2012, BBC in January 2012, and The New York Times in January 2012.

References 

Nanotechnology companies
Companies based in Utah
Technology companies established in 2009
2009 establishments in Utah